Indian Creek is a stream in St. Francois County in the U.S. state of Missouri. It is a tributary of the St. Francis River.

The stream flows north and is impounded as Iron Mountain Lake within the Iron Mountain Lake community.

Indian Creek was so named on account of a nearby Indian village.

See also
List of rivers of Missouri

References

Rivers of St. Francois County, Missouri
Rivers of Missouri